is a (2007-2010) Japanese television series, first shown on NHK on July 19, 2007, based on the Inemuri Iwane novels by Yasuhide Saeki.

Cast

 Koji Yamamoto as Sakazaki Iwane
 Noriko Nakagoshi as Okon
 Ikkei Watanabe as Imazuya Kichiemon
 Masaomi Kondō as Yoshizō
 Rei Dan as Oen
 Hiromi Kitagawa as Osaki
 Yuko Fueki as Kobayashi Nao
 Shun Shioya as Kobayashi Kinpei
 Sei Hiraizumi as Sakazaki Masayoshi
 Masao Komatsu as Kinbei
 Natsuki Harada as Okine
 Riki Takeuchi as Sakai Taizō

External links
 Official website (first season) 
 Official website (second season) 
 Official website (third season) 
 

2007 Japanese television series debuts
2010 Japanese television series endings
Jidaigeki television series
NHK original programming